Jamilla Sofia Rankin (born 9 May 2003) is an Australian soccer player who plays for Brisbane Roar in the W-League.

Early life

Rankin grew up in Northern NSW and played for Brisbane Roar FC/NTC -Football Queensland and later has also played for FNSW Institute in New South Wales. While attending Rosebank Public School, she competed in athletics as well as soccer.

Club career
In March 2020, Rankin made her W-League debut for Brisbane Roar in a 3–1 loss to Melbourne City, starting the match and playing the full 90 minutes. In 2021, Rankin received a young football of the year nomination for February, due to her successful season in the 2020–21 W-League. In August 2021, Rankin re-signed with Brisbane Roar. Her performances in her first two seasons in the W-League earned her favourable comparisons with fellow Australian defenders Steph Catley and Ellie Carpenter.

International career
Rankin was a part of the Junior Matildas team during the 2019 AFC U-16 Women's Championship qualification and final tournament. She featured during two matches of qualification as well as featuring in four games in the final tournament, playing 360 minutes, starting each game she played in.

On 21 November 2020, Rankin was called up for the first ever Women's Talent Identification Camp which was held in Canberra from 22 – 26 of November 2020.

References

External links 
 

2003 births
Brisbane Roar FC (A-League Women) players
Australian women's soccer players
Living people
A-League Women players
Women's association footballers not categorized by position
People from Lismore, New South Wales
Sportswomen from New South Wales
Soccer players from New South Wales